Graven Image is the 23rd album by Jandek, released in (1994) as Corwood Industries release #0761. Although a vinyl test pressing was created, it was the first Corwood product to be issued on CD, and was remastered and re-issued in 2004.

Track listing

Reviews

“Jandek’s blues is one of an almost nightmarish intensity of horror and desperation...”

-- Josh Ronsen -- Monk Mink Pink Punk #3

External links 
Seth Tisue's Graven Image review

Jandek albums
Corwood Industries albums
1994 albums